Architecture and the Built Environment, (A+BE) is an open access series that publishes PhD theses of students of the Delft University of Technology's Graduate School of Architecture and the Built Environment, covering subjects such as: architecture, architectural engineering, green building, heritage, history, urbanism, real estate, housing, geomatics, geodesign, and management. The series was started in 2011 as part of the university's policy on open access and start of the Graduate School of Architecture and the Built Environment. The series is abstracted and indexed in Scopus.

References

External links

Architecture journals
Publications established in 2011
English-language journals
Quarterly journals
Creative Commons-licensed journals